Barbados participated in the 2019 Parapan American Games. They sent the same size delegation as the previous games.

Competitors
The following table lists Barbados's delegation per sport and gender.

Athletics

References

2019 in Barbadian sport
Nations at the 2019 Parapan American Games